Chicken and mushroom pie is a common British pie, ranked as one of the most popular types of savoury pie in Great Britain and often served in fish and chips restaurants. It is also very popular in South Africa.

Ingredients
The outside is usually a full top and bottom crust, with the filling made up of small pieces of chicken and sliced mushrooms in a creamy sauce. The top crust is typically puff pastry. Variations on the theme can use nutmeg or spring onion as part of the creamy filling. Chip shops across the country stock these pies and they also are available to buy in supermarkets.

See also

Pot pie
 List of pies, tarts and flans

References

British pies
English cuisine
New Zealand pies
Savoury pies
Food combinations